Erick Marte Rivera Villanueva (born 14 January 1970) is a Mexican politician affiliated with the PAN. As of 2013 he served as Deputy of the LXII Legislature of the Mexican Congress representing Hidalgo.

References

1970 births
Living people
Politicians from Hidalgo (state)
National Action Party (Mexico) politicians
21st-century Mexican politicians
Deputies of the LXII Legislature of Mexico
Members of the Chamber of Deputies (Mexico) for Hidalgo (state)